Methylorubrum rhodinum is a Gram-negative soil bacterium.

References

External links
Type strain of Methylobacterium rhodinum at BacDive -  the Bacterial Diversity Metadatabase

Hyphomicrobiales
Bacteria described in 1983